The 1974 Australian Indoor Championships was a men's professional tennis tournament played on indoor hard courts at the Hordern Pavilion in Sydney, Australia. It was part of the 1974 Commercial Union Assurance Grand Prix circuit as a Group A category event. It was the second edition of the tournament and was held from 13 October through 20 October 1974. First-seeded John Newcombe won the singles title.

Finals

Singles

 John Newcombe defeated  Cliff Richey 6–4, 6–3, 6–4 
 It was Newcombe's 12th title of the year and the 60th of his career.

Doubles

 Ross Case /  Geoff Masters defeated  John Newcombe /  Tony Roche 6–4, 6–4 
 It was Case's 5th title of the year and the 8th of his career. It was Masters' 3rd title of the year and the 5th of his career.

References

External links
 ITF – tournament edition details

 
Australian Indoor Championships
Australian Indoor Tennis Championships
Indoor
Australian Indoor Championships